Hadnot is a surname. Notable people with the surname include:

James Hadnot (1957–2017), American football player
Jim Hadnot (1940–1998), American basketball player 
Rex Hadnot (born 1982), American football player